The Annual is a series of compilation albums currently published annually by London-based electronic dance music brand Ministry of Sound.  Described as Ministry of Sound's "flagship" series, the popular albums feature house, big beat and trance tracks popular in nightclubs, especially those in the United Kingdom.

History
The Ministry of Sound had been releasing DJ mix albums since 1993, their third year of business as a nightclub, starting with the inaugural edition of the Session, mixed by Tony Humphries. As the label increasingly began to release other mix albums, The Annual was conceived to wrap up the year at the club, a retrospective of defining tracks that defined the nightclub that year. Boy George and Pete Tong, who had DJ'd at the club several times, were hired to compile and mix a disc for the album each. The album was a success, reaching number 13 on the UK Compilations Chart. The Annual II from the following year, however, was a major success, reaching number 1 on the chart. George and Tong mixed the first three albums, before Judge Jules replaced Tong for The Annual IV, and Tall Paul replaced George for the following Millennium Edition and The Annual 2000, before the series stopped using live DJs. The earlier Annuals are held in a high regard, whereas the digitally mixed editions from The Annual 2002 are not as much, with common criticisms being uninspired mixing, track listings and presentation (i.e. including bonus DVDs etc.)

From 1995-1999, the individual releases of The Annual were denoted by Roman numerals, from The Annual to The Annual IV.  In 1999, the series' titling was reorganized and all following albums were named by year, beginning with The Annual 1999 - Millennium Edition.  Starting in 2001, the album was named for the year following the Autumn release date instead of the year of release, thus there is no album assigned to 2001 (aside from the Spring 2001 Annual).  After the Clubbers Guide To .... 2001 (Mixed By Tall Paul) Ministry of Sound decided not to use big name DJs but to use lesser-known DJs that mix digitally, and not credit who the mixer is on the front cover. This has since been denied once, where CJ Mackintosh, Jazzy M and Marc Hughes mixed Fifteen Years in 2006, and several times since then such as on Live & Remastered (though the mixes on this box set were mixed in the 1990s). The Sessions series still continues to be mixed by a DJ.

The original British installments were often released in two versions, one featuring a jewel case and a booklet in a slipcase, and special editions that were essentially leather-bound books with shiny lettering. The leather binding stopped after some volumes, but the book idea was retained until the release of The Annual 2002, which, alongside the other Annuals of the following five years, featured slimline CD cases in a hard box. Later editions have featured various other forms of packaging.

As the series became more popular in the early 2000s, similar (though not identical) albums of the same name were licensed to Ultra Records in the United States, Ministry of Sound subsidiary labels in Australia and Germany, and Universal Music in many countries worldwide, including Italy, Mexico, Argentina, Portugal and the Philippines.  These albums share many tracks with the (original) UK releases, though they are mixed in a different order and replace some songs with more local songs in the track listing.

The Australian Annuals in particular are held in much higher regard than the 21st century UK Annuals, as much more local and underground tracks are used and are always mixed by well-known and underground DJ's. Every Annual since The Annual 2002 have been chart toppers and go either Gold or Platinum and stay on the ARIA Compilation charts and Australian iTunes charts for months on end.

The Annual II remains one of the biggest selling compilation albums of all time in the UK, including quite possibly the biggest selling DJ mix album in the UK. It is listed in the Guinness World Records 2001 as the "Best Selling Club Dance Compilation", with 610,000 copies sold by the publication of that book in 2000.

Spin-offs
The Ibiza Annual series began in a large selling #1 album in August 1998, as mixed by Pete Tong and Boy George. As the title suggests it contains songs big in Ibizan DJ sets. The 1999 edition, despite criticism that it didn't make full usage of the songs available, was well received as was the 2000 edition. Editions starting from 2001 were mixed digitally.

Seasonal editions began in 2001, starting with Spring 2001 (the first digitally mixed Annual). A chillout annual was also released at the end of 2001, The Chillout Annual 2002. The 1997 album Dance Nation 3 was also promoted as the follow-up to The Annual II.

Series overview
Note: These refer to the albums released in the UK under the Ministry of Sound label, and not any of the alternate releases from other countries or labels.

Main series

Ibiza Annual series

Other releases

Australian albums
Note: These albums from The Summer Annual - Summer 2000 to The 2008 Annual were distributed by EMI Music Group Australasia Pty Ltd. The 2009 Annual to The Annual 2017 were distributed by Universal Music Australia Pty Ltd under exclusive license from Ministry of Sound Australia & Ministry of Sound Recordings Ltd. As of mid-2017 all Australian Annuals are produced and distributed by Sony Music Entertainment Australia.

Spring releases

Summer releases

See also
 Ministry of Sound

References

External links
 
 

Compilation album series
Ministry of Sound compilation albums
Electronic compilation albums
House music albums
Big beat compilation albums
Trance compilation albums
DJ mix album series
1990s compilation albums
2000s compilation albums
2010s compilation albums